Dita Parlo (born Grethe Gerda Kornstädt or Gerda Olga Justine Kornstädt; 4 September 1908 – 12 December 1971) was a German film actress.

Early life and career

Dita Parlo was born on 4 September 1908 in Stettin, Pomerania, then in the German Empire. Sources differ as to whether her birth name was Grethe Gerda Kornstädt or Gerda Olga Justine Kornstädt. Her birth year is also sometimes listed as being 1906.

Parlo made her first film appearance in Homecoming (Heimkehr) in 1928 and quickly became a popular actress in Germany. During the 1930s she moved easily between German and French films, achieving success in several films, including, in the span of four years, two that are considered among the greatest in cinema history: L'Atalante (1934) and La Grande Illusion (1937). She was deported to Germany as an enemy alien during World War II, but returned to France in 1949 and resumed her career.

Parlo attempted to establish a career in American films but despite a couple of roles in Hollywood films, was unable to extend her European success. In the late 1930s, she was scheduled to appear in the Orson Welles production of Joseph Conrad's Heart of Darkness for RKO Radio Pictures. However, that project did not come to pass. With the outbreak of World War II, Parlo returned to Germany. She appeared in only three films during the last thirty years of her life, making her final film appearance in 1965.

Personal life and death
In 1949, she married a Protestant pastor, Franck Gueutal, with whom she remained until her death. She died on 12 December 1971 in Paris, France, although some sources list her death date as 13 December. She is buried at Cimetière Protestant de Montécheroux.

In popular culture
Musician Steve Adey has a song called "Dita Parlo" on his 2012 studio album The Tower of Silence. The song was written in response to Jean Vigo's 1934 film L'Atalante. Parlo was referenced by Madonna, who said she had been fascinated by Parlo, and took her name for the character she created for her Sex book and Erotica album. Its title track commences with the line "My name is Dita, I'll be your mistress tonight..." Burlesque performer Dita Von Teese took her name in tribute to Parlo.

Filmography

 Heimkehr (Homecoming) (1928) - Anna
 Die Dame mit der Maske (The Lady with the Mask) (1928) - Kitty
 Geheimnisse des Orients (Secrets of the Orient) (1928) - Slave of the Princess
 Ungarische Rhapsodie (Hungarian Rhapsody) (1928) - Marika
 Manolescu - Der König der Hochstapler (1929) - Jeanette
 Melodie des Herzens (Melody of the Heart) (1929) - Julia Balog
 I bora (1929)
 Au bonheur des dames (1930) - Denise Baudu
 Kismet (1931, German-language version produced by Warner Bros.)
 Tänzerinnen für Süd-Amerika gesucht (1931) - Dancer Inge
 Die heilige Flamme (The Sacred Flame (1931)
 Tropennächte (Tropical Nights) (1931) - Alma
 Menschen hinter Gittern (Men Behind Bars) (1931) - Annie Marlow
 Honor of the Family (1931) - Roszi
 Wir schalten um auf Hollywood (1931) - Herself (uncredited)
 Mr. Broadway (1933, US, starring Ed Sullivan) - The Girl (archive footage) (uncredited)
 L'Atalante (1934) - Juliette
 Rapt (1934)
 Mademoiselle Docteur (1937) - Anne-Marie Lesser - dite Mademoiselle Docteur - une insaisissable espionne
 La Grande Illusion (1937) - Elsa
 L'Affaire du courrier de Lyon (1937) - Mina Lesurques
 Under Secret Orders (1937, English-language version of Mademoiselle Docteur) - Dr. Anne-Marie Lesser
 La Rue sans joie (1938) - Jeanne de Romer
 Ultimatum (1938) - Anna Salic
 Paix sur le Rhin (1938) - Hedwige
 La signora di Montecarlo (1938) - Vera
 L'Inconnue de Monte Carlo (1939) - Vera
 L'Or du Cristobal (Cristobal's Gold) (1940) - Lisbeth
 Justice est faite (Justice is Done) (1950) - Elisabeth
 La Dame de pique (1965) - Comtesse Anna Fedorovna (final film role)

References

External links

 
 
Photograph and brief biography of Dita Parlo
Virtual History - Tobacco cards
Profile

1908 births
1971 deaths
20th-century German actresses
Actors from Szczecin
German film actresses
German silent film actresses
People from the Province of Pomerania
German expatriate actresses in the United States